Manners Creek Station is a pastoral lease that operates as a cattle station in the Northern Territory of Australia.

The property shares a boundary with Lucy Creek and Tarlton Downs to the west, Argadargada and Lake Nash Station to the north, Marqua and Tobermorey to the south and the border with Queensland to the east. Manners Creek, from which the station takes its name, flows through the property at the north eastern end. The Plenty Highway almost bisects the property from west to east.

The lease is just under .

The owner in 2000 was Laurie Facer, who put it up for auction along with 8,000 head of Brahman cross cattle. It was passed in at 5.1 million to Nick Isak.

See also
List of ranches and stations

References

Stations (Australian agriculture)
Pastoral leases in the Northern Territory